Laura Margaret Tingle (born 14 February 1961) is an Australian journalist and author.

She is the chief political correspondent of the Australian Broadcasting Corporation's 7.30 current affairs television program and was previously the political editor of Australian Financial Review.

Career
Tingle began her career in Sydney as a cadet journalist with Fairfax Media's Australian Financial Review and Business Review Weekly in the early 1980s, reporting on financial deregulation and the floating of the dollar. In 1987, she moved to News Limited's The Australian newspaper as an economics correspondent. She was appointed chief political correspondent in 1992 and national affairs correspondent from 1994. In 1996, she returned to Fairfax as a political correspondent for The Age and The Sydney Morning Herald. In 1998, she resigned as Canberra bureau chief for The Age, frustrated by constant interference and lack of attention to her requests, moving to the Sydney Morning Herald. In 2002, she resigned from the Sydney Morning Herald over the combining of The Age and Herald Canberra bureaus, the cutting of staff and the shift to lighter stories, returning to the Australian Financial Review as political correspondent. She was subsequently appointed chief political correspondent and Canberra bureau chief from 2003, then political editor in 2008.

Tingle's book, Chasing the Future: Recession, Recovery and the New Politics in Australia—documenting the recession of the early 1990s—was published in 1994. She has written four issues of Quarterly Essay: "Great Expectations – government, entitlement and an angry nation" in June 2012, "Political Amnesia – how we forgot to govern" in November 2015, "Follow the Leader: Democracy and the Rise of the Strongman" in September 2018 and "The High Road: What Australia Can Learn From New Zealand" in November 2020. Her book In Search of Good Government was published by Black Inc in 2017.

Tingle won Walkley Awards in 2005 and 2011 and has also been highly commended in the Walkley Awards for her investigative journalism. She also won the Paul Lyneham Award for Press Gallery Journalism in 2004 and was shortlisted for the John Button Prize for political writing in 2010. In 2017 she won the Qantas-European Union journalism prize. She makes regular appearances on ABC Radio National's Late Night Live and Insiders on ABC TV.

In February 2018, Tingle left the Australian Financial Review and joined the Australian Broadcasting Corporation as chief political correspondent of current affairs television program, 7.30. Tingle also regularly fills in for Sarah Ferguson on the program.

In March, she signed a $15,000 contract for two days' work with the Turnbull Government's Department of Prime Minister and Cabinet as a host at the Association of South East Asian Nations summit in Sydney. Tingle told The Australian newspaper: "I see absolutely no conflict."

She is the current president of the National Press Club. She was elected in December 2020. Tingle took over from Nine Network journalist, Chris Uhlmann.

Political views and analysis

Tingle is a regular political commentator on the ABC's 7.30 and Insiders programs and is a columnist.

When Tony Abbott became Leader of the Opposition in 2009, Tingle wrote for the Australian Financial Review (AFR) on 1 December that "The election of Tony Abbott is a disaster of epic proportions for a party that was already up against it in the race to remain competitive at the next election. They have now taken a major step to the Right, towards their base, and away from mainstream voters." In the aftermath of the 2010 Australian federal election when the incumbent Gillard Government and Tony Abbott-led Opposition were negotiating with the House of Representatives crossbench about who would form government, Tingle responded to a Treasury analysis of Abbott's costings with an article for the AFR in which she wrote that the Opposition was "not fit to govern" and were either "liars", "clunkheads" or both. Tingle has variously described Abbott as an "oaf", an "utter destructive force" and a "waste of space". When Malcolm Turnbull challenged and won the Liberal leadership and prime ministership from Abbott in an internal party ballot in 2015, Tingle described it as "the end of a particularly poisonous period in Australian politics", saying that "Australia has been pushed sharply to the right" and that Abbott's government was "unlamented ... except at News Corporation". She denounced Abbott's focus on "the Daesh death cult, the ABC, the Ice Epidemic, Labor-appointed boards and public servants".

When Turnbull subsequently resigned as Liberal prime minister ahead of a similar internal party leadership ballot in 2018, Tingle described the replacement of Turnbull with Scott Morrison as "utterly pointless". She judged that the move to oust Turnbull was driven by "pure spite and collective madness". On the day he resigned, Turnbull chose Tingle as the first of a small number of reporters permitted to question him at his final press conference. She asked if he regretted making too many concessions to conservatives.

In June 2018, Communications Minister, Mitch Fifield wrote to ABC Director Michelle Guthrie to make a formal complaint about Tingle making a "false claim" in her reporting of the setting of the date for by-elections. Tingle accused the government of "bastardy". The ABC issued an apology for its news coverage of the event.

During 2019–20 Australian bushfire season, Tingle praised ABC reporters on Twitter for their coverage. When a Twitter follower responded "pity about the lack of balance", Tingle replied with a tweet saying "What, like, 'on the other hand, it's ONLY 4.6 million hectares of Australia that are burning'. A rare editorial engagement: go fuck yourself".

In 2020, Tingle blamed the departure of ABC journalist Philippa McDonald from the ABC on "ideological bastardry" on the part of the Morrison Government in a tweet which concluded "hope you are feeling smug @ScottMorrisonMP". ABC managing director and editor-in-chief David Anderson called the tweet, which Tingle had deleted, a "mistake" during a subsequent Senate Estimates hearing. In 2021, Tingle campaigned strongly for the removal of the Morrison Government's Attorney General Christian Porter after he denied an allegation raised by the ABC that he had assaulted a woman when he was a young person. NSW police pronounced the matter closed on the basis of "insufficient admissible evidence to proceed". Tingle argued in an 3 March editorial for the 7:30 program that it did not matter if he been found guilty of a crime beyond reasonable doubt, but that "perception" was sufficient for his removal. She dismissed comparisons made by Porter to Labor leader Bill Shorten.

Personal life
Tingle was born in Sydney, the youngest daughter of Pam Chivers and journalist John Tingle who, after a long career in journalism with the ABC and commercial radio, founded the Shooters Party in 1992 and was elected to the New South Wales Legislative Council in 1995.

Tingle was educated at the Australian International Independent School.

She married fellow journalist Alan Ramsey in 1995. They separated in 2012 and divorced in 2017. Tingle has one daughter. Tingle has reportedly been in a relationship with actor Sir Sam Neill since 2018.

A portrait of Tingle by James Powditch titled Laura Tingle – the fourth estate was a finalist for the 2022 Archibald Prize. The portrait's composition and Tingle's image were inspired by the monochrome profile image of Marlene Dietrich in the publicity posters and images for the movie Judgment at Nuremberg, and Tingle's image incorporated a collage of texts related to her and chosen by both her and the artist. The portrait was subsequently purchased by Tingle's mother.

References

External links

1961 births
Living people
Australian investigative journalists
ABC News (Australia) presenters
Australian political journalists
Australian columnists
Australian women columnists
Walkley Award winners
Australian women editors
Australian women non-fiction writers